St. Mark's Episcopal School is a private primary and secondary school located in the Cambridge Place development and in West University Place, Texas, in Greater Houston. St. Mark's serves preschool (ages 18 months and up) through Grade 8. The school is located just four miles from the Texas Medical Center and minutes south of the Galleria. St. Mark's is a part of the Episcopal Diocese of Texas and is accredited by the Independent Schools Association of the Southwest and the Southwest Association of Episcopal Schools. The current headmaster of the school is Garhett Wagers.

The school is structured into three divisions - Primary School ( Preschool 2s through Kindergarten), Lower School (1st through 4th grade), and Middle School (5th through 8th grade).

History
St. Mark's Episcopal School was created in 1960 as an educational ministry of St. Mark's Episcopal Church. The school operated as a nursery school for years then gradually began adding elementary grades. The first 8th grade class graduated in 1988. The school received its initial accreditation from the Southwestern Association of Episcopal Schools (recognized by the Texas Education Agency) in 1990. The school earned accreditation from the Independent Schools Association of the Southwest in 2017.

Student life
Primary and Lower School students receive progress reports with narrative comments on your child's growth and development. Lower School students study a sequential curriculum of handwriting, math, word study, reading and writing. Lower School classrooms have close knit classroom communities that are centered on the honor code of respect, responsibility and kindness.

St Mark's has a strong Middle School advisory program for grades 5-8 which encourages character building and an honor-based “St. Mark's Way.”
St. Mark's is committed to preparing 8th graders for high school. The school hosts an annual instructional meeting for all 8th grade students and families and provides ongoing assistance in the high school selection and application process. By 8th grade graduation, St. Mark's students will have completed three high school level courses: Pre-AP Honors Algebra I, Spanish I, and Integrated Physics and Chemistry. St. Mark's graduates consistently place into Spanish II or Spanish II Honors. Graduates are accepted into top Houston area high schools and colleges and universities across the country.

Facilities
The school occupies four main buildings on campus that include three complete computer labs, one library used by all students, three complete science labs, a full basketball court which functions as a gymnasium and stage, a multi-purpose cafeteria, a "flex space" used for extracurricular activities, a music room, an art room, and large bright classroom spaces. The campus is networked so students may work in the labs or on classroom computers. The facility surrounds an attractive courtyard and gardens where children enjoy lunch or outside lessons. Technology is integrated into the curriculum, and the school includes a robust one-to-one iPad program.

Extended Care
The After School program is available to families with students in grades Preschool 3s through 8th grade needing daily or part-time after school care.  The program includes snack time, outside recreation, extensive homework time for older students or informal inside activities for younger children.

The before school program is available to families in need of an early drop-off for students in Preschool 3s through 8th Grade.

Clubs and Activities
In Middle School, students participate in Elective Credit options that allow students to explore their interests and find new passions. Additionally, clubs meet one day a week after school. Some of the clubs include cooking, piano, guitar, violin, Tae Kwon Do, USA Chess, ceramics, fencing, golf and origami.

Fine Arts
Art surrounds the youngest students throughout the school year. Formal art classes begin in Kindergarten and continue through eighth grade, with the introduction of drawing skills, experience with most art mediums and artist studies.

Music theory, singing, theater and performance curriculum is showcased across the school experience. School-wide Fine Arts Events include musical theater performances, holiday concerts, dance recitals, talent shows, and chapel performances.

Athletics
The middle school students at St. Marks compete in GHAC (Greater Houston  Athletic Conference). The St. Mark's middle school athletics program includes: volleyball, soccer, cross country, basketball, swimming, golf, tennis, track & field, and baseball. Lower School students can participate in soccer, cross country, basketball, bounceball, and touch football.

See also

 Christianity in Houston

References

Private K–8 schools in Texas
Private schools in Greater Houston
Schools in Harris County, Texas
Episcopal schools in the United States
Independent Schools Association of the Southwest